Daniel Douglas Orlando (born May 29, 1981), also known as Funkefeller, is an Electro House producer from Phoenix, Arizona. Funkefeller has a computer science background and portrays the Funkefeller identity as a mad scientist. When playing live, Funkefeller can be found in full costume with an extensive amount of gear on stage. His shows are combined with a large plethora of visual effects that seem to have come from a science lab gone haywire.

History
Daniel Douglas Orlando began his music career at the age of 4 years old. His father, Douglas Orlando, gave him piano lessons for many years. Orlando enjoyed most of his days growing up playing in his father's music studio. Once he was 12 years old, Orlando became interested in other instruments. 

Orlando was devastated by the breakup of Fixation 29 and drowning himself in his own music was his way of coping with it. He spent every waking moment of his years. He took many music courses in college, but during this time of focusing intensely on his production skills, he took them to a whole new extreme. He attended a community college his first year, and would sometimes go 4 days straight with no sleep in his father's studio producing music. During this time, he produced many different genres such as metal, pop, alternative and electronic music.

When Orlando left home to attend Illinois State University, others would be dissecting frogs and learning the periodic table while he would be sitting as his desk with a book of blank staff paper writing music scores for a multitude of instruments. He knew he wanted to be part of the Digital Arts Technology program at Illinois State University, but knew it was extremely hard to get into. Musical and technical skills were a must because the program was still being developed and the students who admitted into the program were required to assist the instructors in developing their course curriculum. He applied for the program and was accepted immediately. Orlando enjoyed working so closely with the prestigious Professors that came from the well-respected departments of Theatre, Art, and Music at Illinois State University.

Orlando was a DJ for a number of large underground parties during this time. During his Junior year, he became a DJ for the local radio station, WZND Normal-Bloomington.

Once Orlando had relocated to Arizona, he got into small business entrepreneurship and software programming. He started buying an immense amount of gear for the studio and soon after decided to start a record label called Sonic Masterworks.

Artists that currently have tracks signed to Sonic Masterworks include but are not limited to Funkefeller, Spy VZ Spy, Silent J, Constantine, Switchup, Jason Camiolo, Steph, DJ A-Ros and Miss Krystle.

The SUPER TOXIC EP was Funkefeller's first official release on Sonic Masterworks that was distributed by Acuna Digital and sold all around the world. THE UNKNOWN, a three track single was released soon after, which features vocals by Steph and a remix produced by Jason Camiolo. 
The mad scientist identity came into place right around the same time as the creation of SUPER TOXIC. He felt that the mad scientist identity fit him well as he is very eccentric, off-the-wall, and not your typical computer scientist. His sister, the marketing communications manager at Sonic Masterworks, helped him to build the identity and branding Funkefeller.

Discography

Studio albums
Funked Up (2010)
Filthy (2010)

EPs

Super Toxic (2011)

- "Super Toxic"
- "Live For The Music"
- "For The Hardcore"
- "Bounce"
- "Bounce" (Jason Camiolo Mix)

Singles

"The Unknown" feat. Steph (2011)
"The Unknown" feat. Steph (Dirty Version) (2011)
"The Unknown" feat. Steph (Jason Camiolo Mix) (2011)

DJ Mixes

Funkefeller's March Madness 2011 Mix (2011)
Funkefeller's Birthday LIVE set @ "Jason's Beach House" Event (2011)
Funkefeller May Podcast (2011)

Remixes & Mashups

Black Eyed Peas – “Just Can’t Get Enough” (2011)
Axwell, Tai, Afrojack – “House Music / Paradise Poltergeist / Satisfaction” (2011)
Ke$ha – “We R Who We R” (2011)
Martin Solveig feat Dada Life – “Hello” (2011)
12th Planet – “Needed Change” feat. Skrillex & Foreign Beggars (2011)
Deadmau5, MosDam, Robbie Rivera, Funkefeller – “Sofi Needs a Mashup” (2011)
Feed Me vs Funkefeller – “Blood Red / Live for the Music” (2011)
Liquid Stranger – “Bully” (2010)
Deadmau5 – “One Trick Pony” (2010)
Deadmau5 – “Cthulhu Sleeps” (2010)
Skrillex – “Kill Everybody” (2010)
Skrillex – “Rock N’ Roll” (2010)
Skrillex – “Scary Monsters and Nice Sprites” (2010)
Deadmau5 – “Sofi Needs a Ladder” (2010)
Afrojack – “Bangduck/Pokadots” (2010)
Steve Aoki – “In The House” feat. Zuper Blahq (2010)
Robbie Rivera, David Guetta, Boys Noize, Angger Dimas – “Electro Medley” (2010)
Deadmau5 – “Ghosts and Stuff” (2010)
Nelly Furtado feat. Flo Rida – “Promiscuous” (2010)
New Boyz – “You’re a Jerk” (2010)
Kanye West – “Love Lockdown” (2010)
David Guetta feat. Chris Willis, Fergie, LMFAO – “No Getting Over You” (2010)
Flo Rida feat. Nelly Furtado – “Jump!” (2010)
Alex Kidd vs Funkefeller – “Big Bada Boom / Hunting for Cheese” (2010)
Roxy Cottontail & Larry Tee – “Let’s Make Nasty” (2010)
Deadmau5, Orlando Voorn, Funkefeller – “Paco Di Bango / Some Chords” (2010)
 Morgan Page feat. Rusko – “Empty Girls” (2010)

References

External links
 Funkefeller Official website
 Official label website

1981 births
Living people
Ableton Live users
American house musicians
American electronic musicians
American DJs
Musicians from Chicago
Remixers
Electronic dance music DJs